"Vivo per lei"  (English: "I Live for Her") is a 1995 song recorded by Italian artist Andrea Bocelli as duet with Giorgia Todrani (under the stage name of "Giorgia" only) for his album Bocelli. The song was also released as a duet with other female artists, including Marta Sánchez in Spanish and Latin American countries; Hélène Ségara in francophone countries; Judy Weiss in German-speaking countries; Sandy in Brazilian Portuguese; and Bonnie Tyler in English under the title "Live for Love", though due to record company disputes their version was never released.

The version with Marta Sánchez, under the title Vivo por ella, that was included on her album One Step Closer, peaked at number two in Panama, and reached the top-twenty on the US Billboard Hot Latin Songs. The version with Hélène Ségara was released in December 1997 and became a hit in Belgium (Wallonia) and France, where it reached number one on the charts. It was the fifth single from Ségara's first studio album, Cœur de verre.  The version with Judy Weiss also topped the charts in Switzerland in 1997.

Song information
The song in Italian was originally written by the group O.R.O. (Manzani – Mengalli – Zelli) in 1995 for their album Vivo per.... The song won the "Disco per l'estate" edition of that year. During the same year, the lyrics of the song were rewritten, still in Italian, by Gatto Panceri and the song was relaunched as a duet between Andrea Bocelli and Giorgia. The new lyrics were characterized by the fact that lei ("her") in the title referred to music whereas in the original song lei referred to a girl.

Thus the new version of Vivo per lei became a tribute to music using the pronoun in the title: lei in Italian, ella in Spanish, elle in French, ela in Portuguese, and sie in German, as a metaphor. While the French and German versions have Bocelli singing in Italian, and Ségara and Weiss providing the French and German lyrics respectively, in the Spanish recorded version both Bocelli and Sánchez sing in Spanish, and in the Portuguese version, Bocelli sings in Spanish and Sandy in Portuguese. On live performances of the song, Bocelli may sing exclusively in Italian. The song's piano melody resembles an Elton John composition.

For international versions, German lyrics were written by Michael Kunze, French lyrics by Art Mengo, and Spanish lyrics by Luis Gómez Escolar. There is also a Greek version called Se Thelo edo sung by Dimitra Galani and Giorgos Karadimos.

During Ségara's first tour, the song was performed, but Bocelli was replaced by Bruno Pelletier. This version is available on the live album En concert à l'Olympia, as second track on the second CD. It was also included on Ségara's compilation Le Best of and on Bruno Pelletier's album Sur Scene (2001).

The song was covered in 2004 by Calogero, Chimène Badi and Patrick Fiori on Les Enfoirés' album Les Enfoirés dans l'espace.

Unreleased version
Bonnie Tyler recorded English vocals on the song in 1997, and the song was scheduled to be released as the lead single from her album All in One Voice (1998). It was retitled "Live for Love". Due to disputes between EastWest Records and Sugar Music, their version of the song remains unreleased. In a 2014 interview, Tyler recalled that EastWest asked for more retail royalty points than they agreed following a version Bocelli recorded with Sarah Brightman. Sugar Music refused their demands and terminated the collaboration.

The English version of the song was performed by Bocelli (who performed in Italian) and Heather Headley. Their rendition of the song can be found in Bocelli's live album Vivere Live in Tuscany, originally released in 2007.

Meaning of the song
Panceri and Bocelli's version of the song clearly evokes the blind tenor's attachment to music as the pillar and love of his life:  "I live for her".

The English-speaking listener is challenged to uncover whom the person referred to by lei ("her") is.  Italian, and other Romance Languages routinely assign gender to all their nouns, whereas English, perhaps with the exception of the use of she or her to refer to ships or bad weather, never uses the gender pronouns to replace nouns that refer to inanimate objects.  On first glance it appears the song refers to a woman, perhaps a lover, as the first verse is sung by Bocelli.  The female voice in the second verse suggests that the person is somebody who is respected and loved by both men and women. The lyrics progress to say that "she" is always the protagonist and if there is another life, the singers would devote their lives to her again. Eventually, Bocelli sings, vivo per lei, la musica, "I live for her, music", revealing that the true meaning of the song is about music and how musicians devote their lives to music.

The beauty of the Romance language versions is that they retain their ambiguity due to the possibility that the feminine pronoun may refer to a woman or a girl, or any inanimate object or word that has the feminine gender.  The love of a woman thus becomes a true metaphor for Bocelli's love of music.

Chart performances
In France, the song went straight to number 9 on 6 December 1997, and reached number one four weeks later, thus becoming the sixth bilingual number-one singles in France. It topped the chart for five consecutive weeks, then dropped slowly, remaining for 22 weeks in the top ten, 33 weeks in the top 50 and 42 weeks in the top 100. It was certified Platinum by the SNEP. In Belgium (Wallonia), the single debuted at number 18 on 20 December and achieved number one in its sixth week and stayed there for five weeks, then dropped and fell off the top ten after 15 weeks and the top 40 after 28 weeks. To date, it is the best-selling single for Ségara, and the second one for Bocelli (the first is "Con te partirò").

In Switzerland, the version with Judy Weiss entered the chart at number six on 27 April 1997. It hit number one for a sole week and remained for 26 weeks in the top 50. The song achieved moderate success in Austria where it peaked at number 22 on 18 May 1997 and fell off the top 40 after ten weeks.

Track listings
 Italy
 CD single

 Francophone countries
 CD single

 Digital download

 German-speaking countries
 CD single

 Brazilian Portuguese version
 CD single

Charts and sales

Weekly charts

Italian version with Giorgia

German version with Judy Weiss

French version with Hélène Ségara

Spanish version with Marta Sánchez

Year-end charts

German version with Judy Weiss

French version with Hélène Ségara

Certifications

References

1995 songs
1997 singles
Andrea Bocelli songs
Giorgia (singer) songs
Hélène Ségara songs
Judy Weiss songs
Marta Sánchez songs
Macaronic songs
Ultratop 50 Singles (Wallonia) number-one singles
SNEP Top Singles number-one singles
Number-one singles in Spain
Number-one singles in Switzerland
Pop ballads
Male–female vocal duets
Polydor Records singles